Crytivo is a game publishing company based in San Diego, California. It was founded in 2013 by Alex Koshelkov.

History

Crytivo was founded in 2013 by Alex Koshelkov, following a Kickstarter campaign for the game "The Universim".

Development for The Universim began in April 2014. It was released via Steam Early Access on August 28, 2018.

Crytivo began publishing third-party games in early 2020. Their first third party release, Serin Fate (developed by Vethergen) was released via Steam Early Access in March 2020. Crytivo has signed additional indie development studios and solo developers including Blue Meridian, Soda Den, Ironheart Studios, Rumata Lab, and Dazar Play. Projects that are currently being developed include Prehistoric Kingdom, Roots of Pacha, The Last Shot, and Villagedom.

Games published

 Farlanders: Prologue
 Prehistoric Kingdom
 Serin Fate
 Today is my Birthday
 The Universim
 Weaving Tides
 Trail Out
 Farlanders

Upcoming releases

 Above Snakes
 A New Leaf: Memories
 Farm Folks
 Flea Madness
 Football Story
 Hotel Magnate
 The Last Shot
 Look Alive
 Power to the People
 Ratten Reich
 Rogue Shift
 Roots of Pacha
 Sayri: the Beginning
 Siege the Day
 Villagedom
 Wanderlost

Brief description of games published by Crytivo

Roots of Pacha

Roots of Pacha is a life/farming simulator game in prehistoric setting, developed by US studio Soda Den. This project was funded via Kick starter during February and March 2021.

Wander lost

Wander lost is a life simulator/survival game created by American developer Eli Segal. It tells the story of a man named Bub surviving in a post-apocalyptic world infested by zombies.

References

External links
 Official website

Companies based in California
Video game companies based in California
Video game publishers
Video game companies established in 2013